Laura Kimble (nee Critchfield; born July 11, 1967) is an  American politician who has served as a Delegate from the 48th district to the West Virginia House of Delegates since 2020. Kimble is a member of the Republican Party.

Early life and education
Kimble was born on July 11, 1967, in Loveland, Colorado to parents Clark and Diana Critchfield. Her family moved to Clarksburg, West Virginia when she was nine years old and she graduated from Washington Irving High School. Upon completing her Bachelor of Arts degree in International Studies from West Virginia University, she married Jeffrey Kimble. They have three children.

Career
After spending three years on the Harrison County Republican Executive Committee, Kimble was elected to serve as a Delegate from the 48th district to the West Virginia House of Delegates in 2020.

References

1967 births
Living people
People from Loveland, Colorado
Republican Party members of the West Virginia House of Delegates
21st-century American politicians
West Virginia University alumni
21st-century American women politicians
Politicians from Clarksburg, West Virginia
Women state legislators in West Virginia